Blake Roy Stepp (born February 4, 1982) is an American retired professional basketball player. After a standout prep career at South Eugene High School and college career at Gonzaga University, he was drafted in the second round of the 2004 NBA Draft by the Minnesota Timberwolves. However, Stepp spent two seasons playing overseas, before retiring due to chronic knee injuries at the age of 24. After his basketball career, Stepp also played poker professionally.

Basketball career
A native of Eugene, Oregon, Stepp attended South Eugene High School where he was named the Gatorade Oregon Player of the Year his senior year.

He played college basketball at Gonzaga University. In his four-year career with the Bulldogs, from 2000 to 2004, Stepp averaged 13.0 points, 5.0 assists, 3.9 rebounds and 1.2 steals. He was named the WCC Player of the Year in 2003 and 2004. In 2012, Stepp was inducted into the WCC Hall of Fame.

In the 2004 NBA Draft, Stepp was selected 59th overall by the Minnesota Timberwolves. Stepp appeared in a handful of preseason games with the Wolves, but did not manage to make the final cut. Near the end of 2004, Stepp joined Partizan of Serbia and Montenegro, spending there the rest of the 2004–05 season. After playing for the Cleveland Cavaliers during the NBA Summer League, Stepp spent the 2005–06 season with Valencia in Spain.

Stepp had represented the United States at the 2003 Pan American Games.

In the summer of 2017, Stepp played in The Basketball Tournament on ESPN for team A Few Good Men (Gonzaga Alumni). He competed for the $2 million prize, and for team A Few Good Men, he averaged 10.5 points per game. Stepp helped take team A Few Good Men to the Super 16 round, where they then lost to Team Challenge ALS 77-60.

Poker career
Upon his retirement from basketball, Stepp became a professional poker player, competing at the 2008, 2009 and 2010 World Series of Poker.

References

External links
 Blake Stepp at acb.com
 Blake Stepp at gozags.com
 Blake Stepp at euroleague.net

1982 births
Living people
ABA League players
All-American college men's basketball players
American expatriate basketball people in Serbia
American expatriate basketball people in Spain
American men's basketball players
American poker players
Basketball players at the 2003 Pan American Games
Basketball players from Oregon
Gonzaga Bulldogs men's basketball players
KK Partizan players
Liga ACB players
Minnesota Timberwolves draft picks
Pan American Games competitors for the United States
Point guards
South Eugene High School alumni
Sportspeople from Eugene, Oregon
Valencia Basket players